Banknotes have been issued in Canada and the British colonies that confederated to form Canada from 1 July 1867.

Some issuers issued notes for more than one entity. For example, the Bank of Montreal issued notes for both Lower Canada and Quebec.

This listing does not include the Newfoundland banknote issuers.

Issuers that have a French name will have an English translation.

British Colonial

British Army

British Army Bill (1813–15).        PS118A-120.

Provincial Issues

Alberta Alberta prosperity certificates
British Columbia                                       PS126-128.
Nova Scotia                                            PS132-140.
Ontario                                                PS141-143.
Prince Edward Island                                   PS144-157.
Province of Canada                                     PS161-176.

Chartered Banks

Spurious or Expired Banks

Bank of Acadia                                                   PS1542-1545.
Accommodation Bank                                                     PS1546-1547.
Agricultural Bank, Montreal                                               PS1548-1550.
Agricultural Bank, Toronto                                                PS1551-1564.
Arman's Bank                                           PS1565-1567.
Banque de Boucherville (Bank of Boucherville)          PS1568.
Bank of Brantford                                      PS1569-1576.
British Canadian Bank                                  PS1577-1578.
Canada Bank, Montreal                              PS1579-1580.
Canada Bank, Toronto                               PS1581-1583.
Bank of Canada, Montreal                           PS1584-1595.
Banque Canadienne (Canadian Bank)                      PS1596-1599.
Central Bank of Canada                                 PS1600-1602.
Central Bank of New Brunswick                          PS1603-1617.
Charlotte County Bank                                  PS1618-1622.
Bank of Charlottetown                                  PS1623-1625.

See also

 Bank of Canada
 Canadian chartered bank notes
 Central banks and currencies of the Caribbean
 Commonwealth banknote-issuing institutions
 Currencies of the British West Indies

Banknotes of Canada
Canada